Sumner Ely Wetmore Kittelle (June 14, 1867 – December 29, 1950) was a rear admiral in the United States Navy and a veteran of the Spanish–American War and World War I. He was also the third military Governor of the United States Virgin Islands. Late in life, he also became an author and published a book on his family's genealogy.

Kittelle was born in Peekskill, New York. He graduated from the United States Naval Academy in 1889. He was awarded the Navy Cross for his service during World War I, as commander of the battleship  of the Atlantic Fleet. He was promoted to rear admiral in 1921 and made Governor of the Virgin Islands, a position he held only until 1922. Almost immediately on becoming governor, he sacked the civilian colonial assembly. In 1927, while a commandant of the 16th Naval District, he exposed a plot by "communists" to destroy a shipyard at Cavite. He retired in 1931.

In 1946, Kittelle wrote The Ketel family,: Also (Ketele, Kettele, Kettel, Kittelle and Kittle), a history of his family tree.

References

The 1899 Membership Register for The Empire State Society, S.A.R.
"SUMNER KITTELLE, RETIRED ADMIRAL." The New York Times, December 30, 1950. p. 13

Succession

1867 births
1950 deaths
American genealogists
United States Navy personnel of World War I
Governors of the United States Virgin Islands
People from Peekskill, New York
American military personnel of the Spanish–American War
United States Naval Academy alumni
United States Navy admirals
Recipients of the Navy Cross (United States)
Historians from New York (state)